Naveh (also Romanized as Nāveh; also known as Navakh and Nāveh Khān) is a village in Kalisham Rural District, Amarlu District, Rudbar County, Gilan Province, Iran. At the 2006 census, its population was 149, in 41 families.

References 

Populated places in Rudbar County